Bakers Creek is a  long 3rd order tributary to the Cape Fear River in Bladen County, North Carolina.

Course
Bakers Creek rises in Dublin, North Carolina on the Bear Ford Swamp divide and then flows southeast to join the Cape Fear River about 1 mile southwest of Yorick, North Carolina.

Watershed
Baker Creek drains  of area, receives about 49.1 in/year of precipitation, has a wetness index of 518.97 and is about 21% forested.

See also
List of rivers of North Carolina

Additional Maps

References

Rivers of North Carolina
Rivers of Bladen County, North Carolina
Tributaries of the Cape Fear River